Coesfeld Schulzentrum is a railway station in the town of Coesfeld, North Rhine-Westphalia, Germany. The station lies on the Coesfeld–Münster railway and the train services are operated by Deutsche Bahn. The station is positioned near the Schulzentrum Coesfeld, giving the station's name, as well as Gymnasiums Nepomucenum and Heriburg. The station was re-opened on 10 June 2011.

Train services
The station is served by the following services:

Local service  Coesfeld - Münster

References

Railway stations in North Rhine-Westphalia
Railway stations in Germany opened in 2011